This was a new event to the ITF Women's Circuit.

İpek Soylu won the title, defeating Anastasija Sevastova in the final, 7–5, 3–6, 6–1.

Seeds

Main draw

Finals

Top half

Bottom half

References 
 Main draw

Bursa Cup - Singles
2015 Singles